The Law Rides Again is a 1943 American Western film, directed by Alan James and starring Ken Maynard and Hoot Gibson.

Cast 
Ken Maynard as U.S. Marshal Ken Maynard
Hoot Gibson as U.S. Marshal Hoot Gibson
Jack La Rue as Duke Dillon
Betty Miles as Betty Conway
Emmett Lynn as Eagle-Eye the Scout
Kenneth Harlan as John Hampton, Indian Agent
Chief Thundercloud as Thundercloud
Chief Many Treaties as Chief Barking Fox
Bryant Washburn as Commissioner Lee
Fred Hoose as Hank, Stage driver
Kenne Duncan as Sheriff Jeff
Roy Brent as Marshal with Dillon
John Bridges as Jess, Hotel Thug
John Merton as Henchman Spike
Hank Bell as Tex, Hampton Henchman
Charles Murray Jr. as Henchman
Steve Clark as Pete Conway, Betty's Father
Budd Buster as Commissioner's aide

External links 

1943 films
1943 Western (genre) films
Monogram Pictures films
American black-and-white films
American Western (genre) films
Films directed by Alan James
1940s English-language films
1940s American films